Holby City is a British medical drama television series that was broadcast on BBC One in the United Kingdom between 12 January 1999 and 29 March 2022. The series was created by Tony McHale and Mal Young as a spin-off from the BBC medical drama Casualty, which is set in the emergency department of the fictional Holby City Hospital, based in the equally fictitious town of Holby. The show focuses on the fictional lives, both professional and personal, of the medical and ancillary staff on the hospital's surgical wards. It is primarily filmed at the BBC Elstree Centre in Borehamwood. The show aired twenty-three full series with over 1000 episodes. Young wanted to explore what happened to patients treated in Casualty once they were taken away to the hospital's surgical wards. He opined that Casualty limited itself to "accident of the week" storylines, while Holby City allowed the possibility of storylines about long-term care, rather than immediate life-and-death decisions. A police procedural spin-off, HolbyBlue, began airing from 8 May 2007, running for two series before being cancelled due to poor viewing figures.

The serial features an ensemble cast of regular and recurring characters, and began with 11 main characters in its first series. Characters have since been written in and out of the series, and 16 actors were employed to the show's main cast at its finale. Having appeared in over 500 episodes between the fourth and twenty-third series, the show's longest-serving character is Ric Griffin, portrayed by Hugh Quarshie. Additionally, Holby City features a number of guest artists in each episode as well as recurring characters who appear in story arcs. Many regular cast members in the show have made prior, minor appearances as both patients and staff members in both Holby City and Casualty. In 2015, casting directors hired Niamh Walsh for the regular role of Cara Martinez after a guest part as a patient in Casualty. Producers will sometimes recast significant recurring characters when their original actors are unavailable for another stint. When the character of Beka Levy was reintroduced in 2018, her original actress Rhean McGee could not reprise the role, so they recast the role to Francesca Barrett. Characters from Holby City have appeared in sister shows Casualty  and HolbyBlue and vice versa. Although most characters only guest star, some have become regular cast members. Amanda Mealing joined Casualty as Connie Beauchamp in 2014, following a six-year stint in Holby City. Nick Jordan actor Michael French has had stints in the main cast of both Holby City and Casualty, and Clive Mantle reprised his role as Mike Barratt in Holby City in 1999, two years after leaving Casualty.

Regular characters

Recurring characters

Footnotes

References

Bibliography

External links 

 Holby City characters at the Internet Movie Database

Holby City characters
Holby City